Ramanujan Mathematical Society is an Indian organisation of persons formed with the aim of "promoting mathematics at all levels".  The Society was founded in 1985 and registered in Tiruchirappalli, Tamil Nadu, India. Professor G. Shankaranarayanan was the first President, Professor R. Balakrishnan the first Secretary and Professor E. Sampathkumar the first Academic Secretary. The initial impetus for the formation of the Society 
was the deeply felt need of a new mathematical journal and the necessity of an organisation to launch and nourish the journal.

Publications

The publications of Ramanujan Mathematical Society include the following:
 Mathematics Newsletter: A journal catering to the needs of students, research scholars, and teachers. The Newsletter was launched in the year 1991 with Professor R Balakrishnan as Chief Editor. Currently, Professor S Ponnusamy of IIT Madras is the Chief Editor.
Journal of the Ramanujan Mathematical Society : The Journal was started in 1986 with Professor K S Padmanabhan as Editor-in-Chief.  Initially, it was a biannual Journal. Now it has four issues per year. The present Editor-in-Chief is Professor R Parimala of Emory University, Atlanta, United States and the Managing Editor is Professor E Sampathkumar of University of Mysore.
Little Mathematical Treasures: This is envisaged as a series of books addressed to mathematically mature readers and to bright students. So far only one book has been published under this series: "Adventures in Iteration" by Dr Shilesh A Shirali.
RMS Lecture Notes Series in Mathematics: This is a series consisting of monographs and proceedings of conferences.

Endowment Lectures 
The Society organises the following endowment lectures every year. 
Professor C S Venkataraman Memorial Lectures: The lectures, started in 1996,  are sponsored by Dr C S Venkataraman Memorial Trust, Thrissur, Kerala State.
Professor M N Gopalan Endowment Lectures: The lectures, started in 2000,  are sponsored by Professor  M N Gopalan, Mysore.
Prof J N Kapur Endowment Lectures: The lectures, started in 2002, are sponsored by Professor J N Kapur, New Delhi.
New members are taken in based on their achievements and capabilities.

Executive committee

References 

Srinivasa Ramanujan
Mathematical societies
Indian mathematics
Organisations based in Tiruchirappalli
Science and technology in Tamil Nadu
1985 establishments in Tamil Nadu
Scientific organizations established in 1985